Rear Admiral Andrew Bryson (25 July 1822 – 7 February 1892) was an officer in the United States Navy. He fought in the American Civil War and served as commander of the South Atlantic Squadron.

Naval career

Bryson was born on 25 July 1822 in New York City. He was appointed as a midshipman on 1 or 21 December 1837 (sources vary) and went to sea in the West Indies Squadron from 1838 to 1842, serving first aboard the sailing frigate  and then on the sloop-of-war . He attended the Philadelphia Naval School in Philadelphia, Pennsylvania, from 1842 to 1843 and, upon completing his studies, was promoted to passed midshipman on 29 June 1843.

From 1843 to 1845, Bryson served in the Africa Squadron, first aboard the sailing frigate , then on the sloop-of-war . He next had duty on the Great Lakes aboard the steamer  from 1845 to 1849, then served aboard the stores ship  from 1849 to 1850. Promoted to master on 30 January 1851 and to lieutenant on 30 August 1851, he was aboard the brig  from 1851 to 1853, operating first in the Brazil Squadron and later in the Africa Squadron, then aboard the receiving ship at Boston, Massachusetts, from 1853 to 1855, the sloop-of-war  in the Home Squadron from 1856 to 1858, and the sloop-of-war  in the Brazil Squadron from 1858 to 1859.  He performed duty at the New York Navy Yard in Brooklyn, New York, in 1861, and was serving there when the American Civil War broke out in April 1861.

Promoted to commander on 16 July 1862, Bryson was commanding officer of the gunboat  on special service from 1862 to 1863. He took command of the monitor  in the South Atlantic Blockading Squadron in 1863, and led her in the reduction of Fort Macon in North Carolina and in all major actions that U.S. Navy ironclad warships fought against the defenses of Charleston, South Carolina, between 22 September 1863 and 5 April 1864, during one of which he suffered a slight wound inflicted by a shell fragment. From 1864 to 1865 he commanded the ironclad river gunboat  in the Mississippi River Squadron.

After the end of the Civil War, Bryson was promoted to captain on 25 July 1866 and returned to the steamer Michigan on the Great Lakes as her commanding officer from 1866 to 1869. He then commanded the receiving ship at Boston, Massachusetts, from 1869 to 1870, performed duty at the Boston Navy Yard in Charlestown, Massachusetts, in 1871, and commanded the sloop-of-war  in the European Squadron from 1871 to 1872.

Promoted to commodore on 14 February 1873, Bryson was a member of the Board of Examiners in 1873, then was commandant of the Portsmouth Navy Yard at Kittery, Maine, from 1874 to 1877. He commanded the South Atlantic Squadron from 1879 to 1881 and was promoted to rear admiral on 25 March 1880. He retired from the Navy on either 1 July 1881 or 30 January 1883 (sources vary).

Personal life
Bryson was married to Charlotte Arnold Bryson. They had a son, also named Andrew Bryson (2 September 1851–1 October 1918).

Death

Bryson died at his residence in Washington, D.C., on 7 February 1892. He is buried at Green-Wood Cemetery in Brooklyn, New York.

Notes

References 
Naval History and Heritage Command: Officers of the Continental and U.S. Navy and Marine Corps, 1775-1900.
genealogytrails.com Kings County, New York, Genealogy and History
Find-A-Grave Memorial: Adm Andrew Bryson (1822–1892)
Hamersly, Lewis Randolph. The Records of Living Officers of the U.S. Navy and Marine Corps, Fifth Edition. Philadelphia: L. R. Hamersly & Co., 1890.

External links 
Photograph of grave of Andrew Bryson

1822 births
1892 deaths
Military personnel from New York City
United States Navy rear admirals (upper half)
Union Navy officers
People of New York (state) in the American Civil War
Burials at Green-Wood Cemetery